The following are the national records in athletics in the Gambia maintained by the Gambia Athletics Association (GAA).

Outdoor

Key to tables:

h = hand timing

Men

Women

Indoor

Men

Women

References
General
World Athletics Statistic Handbook 2019: National Outdoor Records
World Athletics Statistic Handbook 2018: National Indoor Records
Specific

Gambia
Records
Athletics
Athletics